Staraya Simonovka is a rural locality (a selo) in Valuysky District, Belgorod Oblast, Russia. The population was 225 as of 2010. There is 1 street.

Geography 
Staraya Simonovka is located 9 km southwest of Valuyki (the district's administrative centre) by road. Novaya Simonovka is the nearest rural locality.

References 

Rural localities in Valuysky District